The Muppets (stylized as the muppets.) is an American sitcom that originally aired on ABC from September 22, 2015 to March 1, 2016. Co-created by Bill Prady and Bob Kushell, the series was produced by ABC Studios and The Muppets Studio, with Randall Einhorn and Muppet performer Bill Barretta serving as executive producers alongside Prady and Kushell. On May 12, 2016, ABC cancelled the series after one season.

The series is set in Los Angeles and depicts the everyday personal and professional lives of The Muppets during production of Up Late with Miss Piggy, a fictional late-night talk show starring Miss Piggy. The Muppets serves as a parody of other mockumentary-style series, such as The Office, Modern Family, and Parks and Recreation by employing the same single-camera setup filming style with the implication of a documentary crew filming everyone. The series stars Muppet performers Steve Whitmire, Eric Jacobson, Dave Goelz, Bill Barretta, David Rudman, Matt Vogel, and Peter Linz in multiple roles.

Background
The series marks the characters' first ongoing prime-time network television series since Muppets Tonight was cancelled in 1998. The Muppets was picked up by ABC, the same network that aired Muppets Tonight—as the characters, the network, and the production companies are all owned by The Walt Disney Company—on the ABC network schedule.

This marks the second time Prady has attempted to revive The Muppets. Before co-creating CBS' The Big Bang Theory, the writer-producer shot some test footage on which ABC ultimately passed. Prady's history with The Muppets dates back to his work on Fraggle Rock in 1987. His previous writing credits for Muppet productions include the Muppet*Vision 3D attraction at Walt Disney World, and the tribute special The Muppets Celebrate Jim Henson, which earned Prady an Emmy Award nomination in 1991.

Executive producer Bob Kushell explained the intention behind the series; "We have the opportunity to explore these characters as individuals with their own emotional lives that are separate from each other and aren't shadowed by each other's presence, as I think they have been for the last 20 years... it's not just a behind-the-scenes look at a show, but it's the relationship-driven, emotional stories that people go through in their personal lives. Everyone in this version of The Muppets wants to push them further in a way they've never been before." Kushell added, "Rightfully or wrongfully, The Muppets became more of a kids' product over the years. We want to bring them all the way back to what they were intended to be and then some. But never so much that anyone has to explain anything uncomfortable to their kids."

Cast and characters

Main cast
 Steve Whitmire as:
 Kermit the Frog, the show's executive producer and Denise's boyfriend.
 Rizzo the Rat, one of Gonzo's staff writers.
 Beaker, Bunsen's frazzled assistant.
 Statler, a heckler and audience member of Up Late with Miss Piggy.
 Lips, the trumpet player of The Electric Mayhem, the show's house band.
 The Muppet Newsman, a local news presenter who operates in a nearby studio.
 Foo-Foo, Miss Piggy's pet Bichon Frise.
 Link Hogthrob
 Eric Jacobson as:
 Miss Piggy, the eponymous host of Up Late with Miss Piggy and Kermit's former significant other.
 Fozzie Bear, a struggling comedian and Piggy's on-air announcer, sidekick and warm-up comic.
 Animal, the crazed drummer of The Electric Mayhem.
 Sam Eagle, the head executive of broadcast standards and practices for ABC.
Marvin Suggs
 Dave Goelz as:
 Gonzo, the head writer of the show.
 Dr. Bunsen Honeydew, a freelance scientist in charge of the show's special effects and the prop department.
Waldorf, a heckler and audience member of Up Late with Miss Piggy.
 Zoot, the reserved saxophone player of The Electric Mayhem.
 Chip, an IT technician.
 Beauregard, the studio janitor.
 Bill Barretta as:
Pepe the King Prawn, one of Gonzo's staff writers.
Rowlf the Dog, the owner of Rowlf's Tavern, a night bar across the street from the studio.
Bobo the Bear, the show's stage manager.
Dr. Teeth, keyboard player and lead vocalist of The Electric Mayhem.
 The Swedish Chef, a chef who is in charge of the show's craft services.
Big Mean Carl, the receptionist for Up Late with Miss Piggy.
Bubba the Rat
Howard Tubman
 David Rudman as:
 Scooter, the show's talent coordinator and associate producer.
 Janice, the lead guitar player of The Electric Mayhem.
 Matt Vogel as:
Uncle Deadly, Miss Piggy's wardrobe supervisor.
 Floyd Pepper, the bass player for The Electric Mayhem.
 Sweetums, the show's cue card operator.
 Lew Zealand
 Crazy Harry
Camilla the Chicken, Gonzo's reunited girlfriend 
Robin the Frog, Kermit's nephew.
 Pops
 Peter Linz as:
Walter, a fan of the Muppets who only appears in the First Look Presentation.
 Gloria Estefan, a Magellanic penguin chick who has a fondness for drinking martinis. He was adopted by Miss Piggy during her trip to Argentina and quickly forms a bond with Uncle Deadly.

Recurring cast
 Julianne Buescher as:
 Denise, a pig who works as a network marketer and is Kermit's girlfriend.
 Yolanda Rat, Kermit's assistant who is good friends with Rizzo.
Debbie, Gonzo's online girlfriend
 Riki Lindhome as Becky, Fozzie's human girlfriend. She was previously played by Margo Harshman in the First Look Presentation.
 Layla Alizada as Betty, the Hair and Makeup Specialist at Up Late with Miss Piggy.
 Nilla Watkins as Kim, the production assistant at Up Late with Miss Piggy.
 June Diane Raphael as Lucy Royce, the president of ABC.
 Utkarsh Ambudkar as Pizza (pronounced "Pache"), a "branding guru" who is appointed by the network to re-brand Up Late with Miss Piggy. He previously branded Keegan-Michael Key, Jordan Peele, Katy Perry, some warlord, and others. He is constantly trying to get The Muppets to do what he wants for the show, and will go as far as to sabotage them if they don't. In episode 15, however, Sweetums, Rizzo, Pepe, and a few others reform him.

Episodes

Production
Bill Prady originated the idea to bring The Muppets back to prime-time television and enlisted Bob Kushell as co-creator and showrunner for the project, allowing Prady to concurrently continue performing his duties as executive producer on The Big Bang Theory, which CBS had renewed through its tenth season, for the 2016–17 season. Before ABC was approached, Netflix expressed interest in co-producing the series as part of its original programming roster.

The Muppets was considered a "stealth, late presentation" in the 2015 comedy development season. After buying Prady and Kushell's pitch, ABC ordered a pilot script and a 10-minute proof of concept filmed presentation, which was filmed at the Walt Disney Studios in May and delivered just in time for ABC schedule consideration. On May 7, 2015, ABC greenlit the series to order as an entry in the 2015–16 television season. The pitch presentation, which was first screened to the public on July 11, 2015, at Comic-Con to  an overwhelmingly positive response, was released online on July 21, 2015. In regards to what Muppet characters to include, producers decided to omit extremely anthropomorphic characters such as "talking vegetables and dancing chickens".

The series was shot at Stages 6 and 7 of the Walt Disney Studios lot in Burbank, California and on-location throughout Los Angeles. Sets must be raised four and a half feet so that the Muppet performers will have room to operate the characters, and all sets have platforms which can be moved. The Muppets received a full 16-episode season from ABC on October 29, 2015.

In early November 2015, it was announced that Kushell was leaving the series, with Kristen Newman in talks to replace him. The move was reportedly part of a creative overhaul of the series, which saw the final six episodes of the first season act as a relaunch of the show. Newman began work during production of the tenth episode, which involved her rewriting the Miss Piggy-Kermit scenes to "bring [their] connection back... that was being walked away from completely" in the early episodes. Newman also hoped to introduce more serialized elements to the series. However, ABC cancelled The Muppets on May 12, 2016 after one season.

After being dismissed from The Muppets performer troupe in 2016, Steve Whitmire talked to the media about how he provided notes on scripts for the series, saying that the longtime performers know the characters best. He cited the episode "Little Green Lie" as an example of how he felt the characters were being scripted wrong, noting: 

ABC cancelled the series in May 2016, "after a midseason show runner change failed to turn around disappointing ratings." Daniel Holloway from Variety added the series had "underperformed following a massive marketing campaign", and noted how "critics derided the series as not family-friendly enough and out of step with the history of the characters".

Broadcast
The Muppets premiered on September 22, 2015 on ABC in the United States. It was broadcast on Sky 1 in the UK, starting Monday October 19, 2015. The series was also acquired by the Seven Network in Australia and premiered on December 29, 2015.

Reception

Critical reception
On the review aggregate website Metacritic, The Muppets has a metascore of 62 out of 100, based on 31 reviews, indicating "generally favorable reviews". On Rotten Tomatoes, the series has a rating of 64%, based on 58 reviews, with an average rating of 6.46/10. The site's critical consensus reads: "The Muppets brings new energy to a beloved franchise—and although longtime fans may be taken aback by the show's adult mockumentary approach, the classic characters retain their essential spirit." The Washington Posts Hank Stuever complimented the series, calling it "a smart and often witty update to the Muppet brand," giving it a "B". Merrill Barr of Forbes wrote a negative review, stating, "By taking these creatures and turning them into 'real' people, the only way to make them funny becomes having them do outlandish things. The only problem is they're inherently outlandish just by existing, so everything they do just feels tame and lifeless by comparison." Dominic Patten of Deadline Hollywood negatively compared the series to Studio 60 on the Sunset Strip. Brian Lowry of Variety gave a more mixed reaction, calling it "something of a mixed bag", praising the humor, but criticizing the subplot of Fozzie dating a human woman. On the other hand, Dorothy Rabinowitz of The Wall Street Journal was more positive toward the series. She wrote, "As soon as you begin watching the new Muppets the question arises—how come no one thought of this before? So perfect is the idea of a late-night talk show called Up Late with Miss Piggy one has to wonder."

Criticism 
The group One Million Moms, an offshoot of the American Family Association, began protesting The Muppets, citing it as "unsuitable for family viewing", and calling for boycotts against it immediately after ABC picked it up, long before the series debuted. The Muppets later parodied One Million Moms' critique in their twelfth episode, "A Tail of Two Piggies", as the One Million Angry Parents Association represented by three protesters.

The Parents Television Council also criticized the series for not meeting "family viewing" guidelines and suggested a boycott, based on the mockumentary format of the series including mentions of plastic surgery, "inside" business language being used in a crude manner, and the Muppets in a bar consuming alcoholic beverages.

Accolades

Ratings

Notes
 This number represents the number of views the First Look Presentation received on YouTube since ABC officially released it on July 21, 2015.
 Episodes premiere one day earlier on City in Canada.

References

External links

The Muppets (2015) at Muppet Wiki

2010s American mockumentary television series
2010s American parody television series
2010s American single-camera sitcoms
2010s American workplace comedy television series
2015 American television series debuts
2016 American television series endings
American Broadcasting Company original programming
English-language television shows
The Muppets television series
American television shows featuring puppetry
Television series about television
Television series by ABC Studios
Television shows filmed in Los Angeles
Television shows set in Los Angeles
Television series created by Bill Prady